Orchipedidae is a family of trematodes in the suborder Xiphidiata.

References 

 Orchipedidae at animaldiversity.ummz.umich.edu

Trematode families